Sarkis Erganian (1870 in Trabzon, Ottoman Empire – 1950 in St. Louis, Missouri) was an Ottoman Armenian painter.

See also
 Armenians in Turkey

References

External links 
Sarkis Erganian's biography

1870 births
1950 deaths
20th-century painters from the Ottoman Empire
Armenians from the Ottoman Empire
People from Trabzon
Ethnic Armenian painters
Burials at Bellefontaine Cemetery
20th-century Armenian painters
Survivors of the Hamidian massacres